Philip Loring Spooner (October 5, 1879May 16, 1945) was an American tenor.

Biography
He was born on October 5, 1879, in Hudson, Wisconsin, to John Coit Spooner and Anne Elizabeth Maine.

He attended Columbia Preparatory School in Washington, D.C., then the University of Wisconsin. He debuted as a professional singer in Boston, Massachusetts, in 1913. In 1916 he was arrested for assaulting a cab driver with his walking stick. While in detention he sang Mother Macree to the other detainees.

He never married and resided with his mother until her death in 1930. He died on May 16, 1945.

References

External links

1879 births
1945 deaths
People from Hudson, Wisconsin
University of Wisconsin–Madison alumni
American tenors
Singers from Wisconsin